Atropus is a generic name that may refer to:

 The Cleftbelly trevally, Atropus atropos, a fish species of which the genus is monotypic.
 Atropoides, a pitviper genus for which Atropus is a junior synonym.